WW Clyde is a heavy civil construction firm based in Orem, Utah, United States (but formerly in nearby Springville).

WW Clyde is a subsidiary of Clyde Companies, Inc, which also owns Geneva Rock, Sunroc, IHC Scott, Sunpro, GWC Capital, Bridgesource, and Beehive Insurance.

Description
WW Clyde was founded in 1926 by Wilford W. Clyde, brother to George Dewey Clyde, who later became a Governor of Utah. The company began as a business focused on building roads, and now specializes in a variety of construction services, including building bridges and other structures, highways, pipelines, mining and mine reclamation, site development, and aggregate processing. WW Clyde operates throughout the western United States. It follows four core values including "We Value People," "Our Word is Our Bond," "Always Give a Full Measure," and "We Continuously Improve." On December 28, 2020, WW Clyde announced the acquisition of Phoenix-based Blount Contracting, Inc.

In 2022, WW Clyde won the national Associated General Contractors Safety Excellence Awards in the category of under 800,000 work hours. WW Clyde won in the Highway and Transportation Division for its efforts navigating the 2021 calendar year without any recordable incidents.

Projects
In the past, WW Clyde has completed many major projects: 
 1940s: Salt Lake City International Airport expansion; St. George Municipal Airport; replacement of Scofield Dam
 1950s: Salt Lake City’s State Street
 1960s: Arthur V. Watkins Dam; Starvation Bridge
 1970s: Utah Power and Light plant and substation; LDS Church Office Building
 1980s: Green River Bridge; Interstate 215 belt route 
 1990s: Barney’s Canyon Pipeline; South Towne Center
 2000s: 2002 Winter Olympics projects; Point of the Mountain Aqueduct Pipeline
 2010s: Pioneer Crossing; Pioneer Wind Farm
 2020s: Utah State Route 154

References

External links

Companies based in Orem, Utah
Construction and civil engineering companies of the United States
1926 establishments in Utah
Springville, Utah